Grevillea bronweniae is a species of flowering plant in the family Proteaceae and is endemic to the south-west of Western Australia. It is an erect shrub usually with more or less linear leaves, and wheel-like clusters of crimson flowers.

Description
Grevillea bronweniae is an erect shrub that typically grows to a height of
.

Taxonomy
Grevillea bronweniae was first formally described by botanist Gregory John Keighery in Nuytsia in 1990. The specific epithet (bronweniae) honours Keighery's wife and botanist, Bronwen Keighery.

The FloraBase of the Western Australian Herbarium gives this taxon the name Grevillea bronwenae.

Distribution and habitat
This grevillea grows in low woodland between Nannup and Busselton in the Jarrah Forest and Swan Coastal Plain biogeographic regions of south-western Western Australia.

Conservation status
Grevillea bronweniae is listed as  "Priority Three" by the Government of Western Australia Department of Biodiversity, Conservation and Attractions, meaning that it is poorly known and known from only a few locations but is not under imminent threat.

References

bronwenae
Eudicots of Western Australia
Proteales of Australia
Plants described in 1990
Taxa named by Gregory John Keighery